Strautmanis is a surname. Notable people with the surname include:

Augusts Strautmanis (1907–1990), Latvian chess player
Michael Strautmanis (born 1969), American lawyer